Ronald Green may refer to:

Ronald Green (basketball) (1944–2012), American-Israeli basketball player
Ronald Green (Dominican politician), Dominican politician and leader of the United Workers' Party
Ronald C. Green, American politician in Houston, Texas
Ronald L. Green (born  1964), Sergeant Major of the Marine Corps (2015–2019)
Ronald Michael Green, American theologian
Ron Green (American football), see 1966 Minnesota Vikings season
Ron Green (footballer) (born 1956), English footballer
Death of Ronald Greene (died 2019), African-American victim of police brutality

See also
Ron Greene (1938–2021), American basketball coach